The Fourth Republic is the current republican government of Nigeria. Since 1999, it has governed the country according to the fourth republican constitution. It was in many ways a revival of the Second Republic, which was in place between 1979 and 1983 and suffers many of the same problems, such as multiple ministries which made policy planning difficult. Nigeria adopted the constitution of the Fourth Republic on 29 May 1999.

Founding (1999) 
Following the death of military dictator and de facto ruler of Nigeria, General Sani Abacha in 1998, his successor General Abdulsalami Abubakar initiated the transition which heralded Nigeria's return to democratic rule in 1999. The ban on political activities was lifted, and political prisoners were released from detention facilities. The constitution was styled after the ill-fated Second Republic — which saw the Westminster system of government jettisoned for an American presidential system. Political parties were formed (People's Democratic Party (PDP), All Nigeria Peoples Party (ANPP), and Alliance for Democracy (AD)), and elections were set for April 1999. In the widely monitored 1999 election, former military ruler Olusegun Obasanjo was elected on the PDP platform. On 29 May 1999, Obasanjo was sworn in as President and Commander-in-Chief of the Federal Republic of Nigeria.

In the controversial general election on 21 April 2007, Umaru Yar'Adua of the PDP was elected president.

Following the death of Umaru Yar'Adua on 5 May 2010, Goodluck Jonathan became the third president(Interim) and later won the election the following year which was largely accredited as freer and fairer than all the previous elections of the 4th Republic. Muhammadu Buhari then won the general elections on 28 March 2015 after the PDP rule of sixteen years (1999–2015).

Presidents

Political parties

Major parties 

All Progressives Congress (APC) - ruling party
People's Democratic Party (PDP) - opposition party

Defunct major opposition

All People's Party (APP)
Alliance for Democracy (AD)
All Nigeria Peoples Party (ANPP)
Congress for Progressive Change (CPC)

Minor parties

Constitutional amendments
 Third Term Agenda

See also
 Nigerian First Republic (1963–66)
 Nigerian Second Republic (1979–83)
 Nigerian Third Republic (1992–93)

Further reading
 John A. Ayoade, and Adeoye A. Akinsanya, eds. Nigeria's Critical Election, 2011 (Lexington Books; 2012)

References

 The History of Nigeria
 Media Accountability and Democracy in Nigeria

Republic of Nigeria 04
History of Nigeria
Politics of Nigeria
Nigeria
1999 establishments in Nigeria
1990s in Nigeria
2000s in Nigeria
2010s in Nigeria